Stankowo may refer to the following places:
Stankowo, Greater Poland Voivodeship (west-central Poland)
Stankowo, Elbląg County in Warmian-Masurian Voivodeship (north Poland)
Stankowo, Szczytno County in Warmian-Masurian Voivodeship (north Poland)
Stańkowo, Pomeranian Voivodeship (north Poland)